Mecostethus parapleurus is a species of band-winged grasshopper in the family Acrididae. It is found in the Palearctic.

Subspecies
These subspecies belong to the species Mecostethus parapleurus:
 Mecostethus parapleurus parapleurus (Hagenbach, 1822) (Green Leek Grasshopper)
 Mecostethus parapleurus turanicus Tarbinsky, 1928

References

External links

 

Acrididae